Lajos Szendrődi (1913–1968) was a Hungarian international footballer who played for Elöre FC Békéscsaba and Elektromos FC.

He managed Køge BK, Denmark (for one match), Esbjerg fB, Djurgårdens IF, AIK and APOEL.
In 1954, he became Danish champions with Køge BK. This was also the first time a club outside Copenhagen became champions

References

External links

1913 births
1968 deaths
Hungarian footballers
Hungary international footballers
Hungarian football managers
Hungarian expatriate football managers
Køge Boldklub managers
Denmark national football team managers
Esbjerg fB managers
Djurgårdens IF Fotboll managers
AIK Fotboll managers
APOEL FC managers
Expatriate football managers in Denmark
Expatriate football managers in Sweden
Association football forwards